The smooth-backed frog (Lithobates psilonota) is a species of frog in the family Ranidae endemic to Mexico.

This species is native to western Mexico, including southern Zacatecas, northern Aguascalientes, and southern Nayarit, and south to western Jalisco and northwestern Colima. It inhabits the basins of the Ameca, Armeria, and Grande de Santiago rivers, between 350 and 2,400 meters elevation.

Its natural habitats are temperate forests, subtropical or tropical moist montane forests, and rivers.

It is threatened by habitat loss.

References

Sources
  (1984) A new species of frog of the Rana tarahumarae group from southwestern Mexico. Copeia 1984: 398–403.
  (2005): Phylogeny of the New World true frogs (Rana). Mol. Phylogenet. Evol.'' 34'''(2): 299–314.  PDF fulltext.

Lithobates
Endemic amphibians of Mexico
Fauna of the Sierra Madre Occidental
Fauna of the Trans-Mexican Volcanic Belt
Río Grande de Santiago
Amphibians described in 2001
Taxonomy articles created by Polbot